Gulobod is an urban-type settlement in Samarqand Region, Uzbekistan. It is the seat of Samarqand District. Its population was 779 people in 1989, and 5,700 in 2016.

References

Populated places in Samarqand Region
Urban-type settlements in Uzbekistan